The pelvic-spot wrasse (Pseudocheilinops ataenia), also known as the midget wrasse or pink-streaked wrasse, is a species of wrasse native to tropical waters of the western Pacific Ocean. Pseudocheilinops ataenia is the only known member of its genus.

References

Labridae
Fish described in 1960